Wairoa College is a co-educational secondary school located in Wairoa, Hawkes Bay, New Zealand. It was expanded to include students from years 7 and 8 in 2005. A building project to accommodate the increased roll was complete by 2008. Wairoa College offers a curriculum designed around NCEA and WAI (Wairoa Achievement Initiative) assessments.

References

External links
 Official website

Secondary schools in the Hawke's Bay Region
Wairoa